The Distributor Wing DW-1 was a prototype agricultural aircraft of unorthodox design, designed by Ken Razak in the United States and marketed by Aerial Distributors in the 1960s.

Design
Developed with assistance from NASA, the University of Wichita and the University of Robbins, California, the aircraft was unusual in that it had a second engine mounted directly below its main powerplant, using this second motor to power a distribution system that used compressed air to carry dry chemicals from a hopper and blow them out of the trailing edges of its wings, over the flaps. Varying the power of this blower engine also provided lift control.

Flight testing and cancellation
First flown on January 30, 1965, the DW-1 was flight tested over several years, with the cowling being revised during testing. Development was terminated by economic conditions in the fertilizer market.

Specifications (Production DW-1)

See also

References

External links

 Photo at aerofiles

DW-1
Abandoned civil aircraft projects of the United States
1960s United States agricultural aircraft
Single-engined tractor aircraft
Low-wing aircraft
Aircraft first flown in 1965